Charit Tingsabadh (born 1950) is an economist and director of the Centre for European Studies at Chulalongkorn University in Bangkok.

Education
Tingsabadh was educated in Thailand and at Strathallan School near Perth, Scotland. He graduated from Magdelene College, Cambridge with an economics tripos in 1971. That year he entered the University of Birmingham, graduating with a Master of Social Science in national economic planning in 1974. From 1976 to 1981 he studied for a PhD in development planning at University College London.

Career
In-between postgraduate degree courses (1974–1975) Tingsabadh worked as an economist in the Regional Planning Division of the National Economic and Social Development Board in Thailand. In 1975 he began lecturing in the Faculty of Economics, and he continues to lecture at Chulalongkorn University.

Tingasabadh served as assistant director of the Social Research Institute at Chulalongkorn from 1981 to 1984. In 1986 he was appointed assistant professor in the Faculty of Economics. From 1987 to 1991 he was the deputy director of the Social Research Institute and from 1991 to 1995 he was deputy director of the Environmental Research Institute.

In 1996 he was appointed director of the Centre for Ecological Economics in the Faculty of Economics at Chulalongkorn. He also became a member of the Research Subcommittee on Forestry and Multipurpose Trees with the National Research Council.

Since 2000 he has served as director of the Centre for European Studies at Chulalongkorn. He is an advisor to the editor of the Journal of European Studies, published by the Centre for European Studies.

Tingsabadh is a member of the advisory committee to the ASEAN Energy Market Integration (AEMI) Initiative.

Publications
Tingasbadh has numerous publications to his name.

References

1950 births
Living people
Charit Tingsabadh
Charit Tingsabadh
Charit Tingsabadh
Alumni of Magdalene College, Cambridge
Alumni of University College London
Alumni of the University of Birmingham
People educated at Strathallan School